The 2017–18 SMU Mustangs women's basketball team will represent Southern Methodist University in the 2017–18 NCAA Division I women's basketball season. The Mustangs, led by second year head coach Travis Mays, play their home games at Moody Coliseum and are fifth year members of the American Athletic Conference.  They finished the season 10–20, 4–12 in AAC play to finish in tenth place. They lost in the first round of the American Athletic women's tournament  to East Carolina.

Media
All Pony Express games will air on KAAM. Before conference season home games will be streamed on Pony Up TV. Conference home games will rotate between ESPN3, AAC Digital, and Pony Up TV. Road games will typically be streamed on the opponents website, though conference road games could also appear on ESPN3 or AAC Digital.

Roster

Schedule and results

|-
!colspan=12 style=""| Non-conference regular season

|-
!colspan=12 style=""| AAC regular season

|-
!colspan=12 style=""| AAC Women's Tournament

See also
2017–18 SMU Mustangs men's basketball team

References

External links
SMU Mustangs women's basketball official website

SMU Mustangs women's basketball seasons
SMU